Gornja Garešnica   is a village in Berek municipality, Bjelovar-Bilogora County, Croatia. It is connected by the D26 highway.

Populated places in Bjelovar-Bilogora County